The Boy is a Canadian animated television series that aired on YTV from January 2004 to September 2005. The series is about the adventures of Toby Goodwin, a boy genius and a member of the International Federation For Peace. With his partner, agent Bob Saint-Vincent, he travels all over the world to fight villains.

In the United States, the series aired on Animania HD.

Episodes

Season 1
Poka
Invisible Boy
Hide'n Go Boy
Free Inside
Jack Flash
Fish'n Chips
Bug Hunter
Bad Boy
Batteries Not Included
Beam Me Up Bob
Most Dangerous Situation
Tango
One Plus One Equals Dead
Boy of the Dolphin
Boy's Best Friend

Season 2
Xeno Boy
I Told You So
Pressure Factor
I, Ludd
Hold That Thought
Coyote Boy
If You See What I Mean
Three Card Monty
Golden Boy
The Sky is Falling
Boy vs. Volcano

References

External links
 

2000s Canadian animated television series
2004 Canadian television series debuts
2005 Canadian television series endings
Animated television series about children
Canadian children's animated action television series
Canadian children's animated adventure television series
Canadian children's animated drama television series
Canadian children's animated science fiction television series
YTV (Canadian TV channel) original programming
Television series by Corus Entertainment